Crystal Mall is an enclosed, two-level regional mall in Waterford, Connecticut. It is situated in a central retail area off the Hartford Turnpike (Route 85), across from a smaller, open-air  shopping center, Waterford Commons. Its primary trade area includes a trade population of 296,161 people, mostly serving the nearby towns of Waterford, Stonington, Norwich, Groton and New London. It is currently anchored by the traditional chains Christmas Tree Shops and JCPenney while featuring traditional stores including but not limited to Bath and Body Works, Forever 21, Men's Warehouse, Rue 21, Talbot's, and Victoria's Secret.

History
The mall was developed in 1984 by New England Development. When it opened, it was the only regional mall in the area, and many smaller shopping centers faced strong competition. Some, like nearby New London Mall, were eventually forced to change strategies, such as becoming a "lifestyle center". The original anchors were Sears, JCPenney, Filene's, and Jordan Marsh. Jordan Marsh became Macy's in 1996.

After about 10 years in operation, Crystal Mall's look was becoming outdated, and management realized it needed to be renewed. In 1997, the mall underwent a renovation to upgrade its interior design.  The previous dark color scheme was replaced by a brighter white, the food court was remodeled, and lighting as well as other fixtures were improved. The elegant center chandelier was slated to be removed during the renovations, but the fixture was popular with shoppers, so it was shined and has remained. The mall has still been criticized for its aging exterior look, and for not updating its tenants to keep up with the times.

In 2006, one of the mall's longstanding anchors Filene's closed its store, as this was one of a number of New England Malls that had both a Macy's and Filene's. After the May Co Department Store Company was purchased by Federated Department Stores (now renamed Macy's, Inc.) duplicate stores were closed at many New England malls. In 2007, it was announced that two anchors would backfill the original Filene's Christmas Tree Shops and Bed Bath & Beyond.  Both retailers opened a few months later in early 2008, with Christmas Tree Shops on the first level, and Bed Bath & Beyond on the second level.

On October 15, 2018, It was announced Sears would shutter as part of an ongoing plan to phase out of brick-and-mortar. The store closed on January 6, 2019. Several prospective tenants have been in discussion.

On January 6, 2021, Macy's, which maintains additional larger outposts, announced as part of a strategy to focus on their highest achieving locations that they would be leaving the center. The store closed on March 21, 2021. On November 1, 2021, it was reported that the original Macy's location had been sold to a development firm.

On September 15, 2022, it was announced that Bed Bath & Beyond would close their Crystal Mall location as part of their plan to close 56 of their stores. The store closed permanently on January 9, 2023.

On February 2, 2023, a fire broke out in one of the kitchens located in the food court, causing the mall to be closed temporarily. No one was injured during the incident.

List of anchor stores

References

Shopping malls in Connecticut
Buildings and structures in Waterford, Connecticut
Shopping malls established in 1984
Tourist attractions in New London County, Connecticut
1984 establishments in Connecticut